Ladhowal railway station is a small railway station in Ludhiana district, Punjab. Its code is LDW. It serves Ladhowal town. The station consists of two platforms. The platforms are not well sheltered. It lacks many facilities including water and sanitation.

References 

Railway stations in Ludhiana district
Firozpur railway division